Brandon Paul Brian Williams (born 3 September 2000) is an English professional footballer who plays as a full-back for Premier League club Manchester United. Although he mainly plays as a left-back, he has also been used as a right-back.

Williams is a graduate of the Manchester United youth academy and made his first-team debut in September 2019. He has represented England at under-20 and under-21 levels.

Early life
Williams was born on 3 September 2000 in Manchester. He grew up in the Harpurhey area were he would attend nearby secondary school Co-op Academy Manchester.

Club career

Manchester United
Williams was included in the Manchester United travelling squad for the UEFA Champions League match against Paris Saint-Germain in March 2019, but was not named in the match squad. He made his first-team debut on 25 September as a substitute in an EFL Cup match against Rochdale. He made his first start on 3 October in the UEFA Europa League match against AZ Alkmaar. Williams signed a new long-term contract on 17 October, keeping him at the club until June 2022. He made his Premier League debut on 20 October against Liverpool at Old Trafford as a late substitute. With Ashley Young suspended and Luke Shaw injured, Williams was handed his first league start on 10 November against Brighton & Hove Albion, playing 90 minutes before being substituted for Marcos Rojo in injury time; he was voted Man of the Match by his club's fans. On 24 November, Williams scored his first goal for Manchester United in a 3–3 draw with Sheffield United.

On 4 August 2020, Williams signed a new four-year deal at United, with the option to extend a further year.

Loan to Norwich City
On 23 August 2021, Williams joined Norwich City on loan for the duration of the 2021–22 season. On 28 August, Williams made his debut against Leicester City in a 2–1 loss.

International career
On 30 August 2019, Williams received his first England call-up for the under-20 squad ahead of fixtures against the Netherlands and Switzerland. He made his debut during the 0–0 draw with the Netherlands at the stadium of Shrewsbury Town on 5 September.

On 5 October 2020, Williams received his first call-up to the England U21 squad. Williams started and made his debut in a 3–3 draw against Andorra U21 on 7 October.

Controversy 
In October 2020, Williams came under fire on social media for allegedly sending messages to a 15-year-old girl on the video-sharing application TikTok. The girl reportedly posted a video to prove he had contacted her. Williams and his representatives denied the claims, with Manchester United defending him.

Career statistics

Honours
Manchester United
UEFA Europa League runner-up: 2020–21

References

External links

Profile at the Manchester United F.C. website

2000 births
Living people
Footballers from Manchester
English footballers
England youth international footballers
England under-21 international footballers
Association football defenders
Manchester United F.C. players
Norwich City F.C. players
Premier League players